Basler Kantonalbank (Basel Cantonal Bank) is a Swiss cantonal bank that is one of the 24 cantonal banks serving Switzerland's 26 cantons. Founded in 1899, in 2019 Basler Kantonalbank had 15 branches with 842 employees; the total assets of the bank were CHF 27.305 billion. Basler Kantonalbank has a full state guarantee of its liabilities.

History
Since 1999, it has had a majority ownership of Bank Cler (former Coop Bank).

In October 2012 the bank's CEO, Hans Rudolf Matter, resigned after 620 clients lost more than CHF 100 million in a scandal involving ASE investments.  Eventually the number of affected clients grew to about 1,500.

In 2013, Chairman Andreas Albrecht was forced to resign following the Swiss Financial Market Supervisory Authority (FINMA) determined that the bank had rigged sales of its own participation certificates. On 21 November 2013, BKB was ordered to pay back CHF 2.6 million ($2.9 million) that it had earned through these improper sales.

Organization 
The highest governing body of Basler Kantonalbank is the Bank Council. This council has 9 members, with Adrian  as the current president.  Operational responsibility lies with the executive Board, which has six members and is currently headed by Basil Heeb ([Chief Executive Officer]).

See also 
 Cantonal bank
 List of banks in Switzerland

References

External links 
 
 The BKB Financial Year in 2019
 

Cantonal banks
Companies listed on the SIX Swiss Exchange